Leandro Hernán Bottasso (born April 23, 1986) is a male professional track and road cyclist from Argentina. In 2009 he was a member of the Colavita–Sutter Home cycling team.

Career
2007
  in Pan American Games, Track, Keirin, Rio de Janeiro (BRA)
2009
5th in GP Aniversario Ciudad de Villa María (ARG)

References
 

1986 births
Living people
Argentine male cyclists
Argentine track cyclists
Cyclists at the 2007 Pan American Games
Cyclists at the 2011 Pan American Games
Cyclists at the 2015 Pan American Games
Cyclists at the 2019 Pan American Games
Pan American Games bronze medalists for Argentina
Pan American Games medalists in cycling
Medalists at the 2007 Pan American Games
Medalists at the 2011 Pan American Games
Medalists at the 2019 Pan American Games
20th-century Argentine people
21st-century Argentine people